Kazimierz Florian Plocke (born 3 May 1958 in Domatowo, Kashubia) is a Polish politician. He was elected to the Sejm on 25 September 2005, getting 9,579 votes in 26 Gdynia district as a candidate from the Civic Platform list. He speaks fluent Kashubian language.

He was also a member of Sejm 2001-2005.

See also
Members of Polish Sejm 2005-2007

External links
Kazimierz Plocke - parliamentary page - includes declarations of interest, voting record, and transcripts of speeches.

1958 births
Living people
People from Puck County
Polish people of Kashubian descent
Civic Platform politicians
Members of the Polish Sejm 2001–2005
Members of the Polish Sejm 2005–2007
Members of the Polish Sejm 2007–2011
Members of the Polish Sejm 2011–2015
Members of the Polish Sejm 2015–2019
Members of the Polish Sejm 2019–2023
University of Warmia and Mazury in Olsztyn alumni